Stanley "Bull" Batinski (March 4, 1917 – January 29, 1990) was an American football player.

A native of Greenfield, Massachusetts, Batinksi attended Greenfield High School and played college football for Temple University from 1938 to 1940.

He played professional football in the National Football League as guard and tackle for the Detroit Lions (1941, 1943–1947), Boston Yanks (1948), and New York Bulldogs (1949). He appeared in 81 games, 46 as a starter, and was selected by Pro Football Illustrated as a first-team guard on the 1945 All-Pro Team. He missed the 1942 while serving in the U.S. Army, but returned to the Lions after receiving a medical discharge in February 1943.

References

1917 births
1990 deaths
American football offensive linemen
Temple Owls football players
Detroit Lions players
Boston Yanks players
New York Bulldogs players
People from Greenfield, Massachusetts
Players of American football from Massachusetts